(God's time is the very best time), also known as Actus tragicus, is an early sacred cantata composed by Johann Sebastian Bach in Mühlhausen, intended for a funeral.

The earliest source for the composition is a copied manuscript dated 1768, therefore the date of the composition is not certain. Research leads to a funeral of a former mayor of Mühlhausen on 16 September 1708. The text is a carefully compiled juxtaposition of biblical texts, three quotations from the Old Testament and four from the New Testament, combined with funeral hymns, of which two are sung and one is quoted instrumentally, and some additions by an anonymous author. Bach scored the work for four vocal parts and a small ensemble of Baroque instruments, two recorders, two violas da gamba and continuo. The work is opened by an instrumental Sonatina, followed by through-composed sections which have been assigned to four movements. The structure is symmetrical around a turning point, when the lower voices, who contemplate the Old Covenant, are overcome by a soprano calling for Jesus.

History 
Although Bach's manuscript is lost, the work is agreed to be one of the earliest Bach cantatas, probably composed during the year he spent in Mühlhausen 1707/1708 as organist of the Divi Blasii church, at the age of 22. Various funerals known to have taken place at this time have been proposed as the occasion for the composition, for example that of his uncle Tobias Lämmerhirt from his mother's family, who died in Erfurt on 10 August 1707, and that of Adolph Strecker, a former mayor of Mühlhausen, whose funeral was 16 September 1708.

The earliest surviving manuscript, in the hand of Christian Friedrich Penzel, was copied in 1768 after Bach's death. It introduced the title Actus tragicus. The cantata was published in 1876 as part of the first complete edition of Bach's works: the Bach-Gesellschaft-Ausgabe, edited by Wilhelm Rust.

Theme 
The text consists of different Bible passages from the Old and New Testament, as well as individual verses of hymns by Martin Luther and Adam Reusner, which all together refer to finitude, preparation for death and dying. There are two distinct parts to the cantata: the view of the Old Testament on death shown in the first part is confronted by that of the New Testament in the second part, leading to a symmetrical structure. The juxtaposition of texts from the Old and New Testament appeared before in the Christliche Betschule (Christian school of prayer) by Johann Olearius. Markus Rathey, professor at the Yale Institute of Sacred Music, has argued that the sermon given at the funeral of Strecker is similar in ideas to the themes of the cantatas. This may be an indication that Bach composed the work for this occasion.

Music

Structure and scoring 
Bach scored the cantata for four vocal parts (soprano (S), alto (A), tenor (T), and bass (B)) and a chamber ensemble of Baroque instruments: two alto recorders (Fl), two violas da gamba (Vg), basso continuo. The duration is given as 23 minutes.

The sections comprising the cantata are traditionally grouped into four movements. The musicologist Carol Traupman-Carr notes: "Although movements are marked by tempo changes, occasionally key changes, meter changes, and double bar lines, Cantata 106 appears to be a continuous work. Bach helps create a more seamless effect by occasionally resolving the cadence of one section at the downbeat of another, thus blurring the beginnings and endings of traditional movements." The keys and tempo markings are taken from the first publication. The keys in the Neue Bach-Ausgabe and other more recent publications start in F major.

Movements

1 
In the opening sonatina, marked Molto adagio, two obbligato alto recorders mournfully echo each other over a sonorous background of viola da gambas and continuo.

2 
The first vocal movement combines several aspects of getting ready to die, based mostly on texts from the Old Testament. Bach expresses their ideas in a variety of musical form and scoring. The movement opens (2a) on a text in free poetry, "" (God's time is the best of all times). The chorus has no initial tempo marking, but has a fugal section marked Allegro, and the end is Adagio assai.

The thought from Psalm 90 (2b), ""  (Ah, Lord, teach us to consider that we must die) is rendered as an arioso of the tenor, marked Lento. The melodic line is broken by rests of reflection.

The warning to be prepared for death (2c) from Isaiah, "" (Put your house in order; for you will die), is performed as an aria by the bass, marked Vivace. Arpeggios of the recorder accompany the voice which has been described as "evocative of the command of God".

Marked Andante, the movement concludes (2d) with the central piece in the symmetrical composition. It presents a contrast: while the lower choral voices recall the Old Covenant, "" (It is the ancient law: human, you must die!), based on Jesus Sirach, the solo soprano turns to accepting death as a union with Jesus, singing three times "" (Yes, come, Lord Jesus!). The personal decision is supported by the instrumental quotation in the recorders of Johann Leon's hymn "" (I have brought my affairs home to God). The final call to Jesus closes the movement, leading to a long rest. The musicologist Wendy Heller writes:

3 
The second vocal movement is a similar combination of ideas, now mostly from the New Testament. It quotes twice what Jesus said on the cross according to the Gospel of Luke. The first quotation (3a), "" (Into Your hands I commit my spirit), with an added explanation "" (You have redeemed me, Lord, faithful God), from Psalm 31, is rendered as an alto aria.

4 
The work concludes with the closing seventh stanza of Adam Reusner's hymn "", "" (Glory, praise, honor, and majesty), as a choral movement, but not a simple four-part setting. Introduced by an instrumental passage recalling motifs from the Sonatina, the first lines of the hymn are set for four parts. The movement ends in a double fugue on Amen marked Allegro. The musicologist Julian notes that the fugal section became the "major focus of the piece".

Evaluation 
The cantata ranks among Bach's most important works. The Bach scholar Alfred Dürr called the cantata "a work of genius such as even great masters seldom achieve... The Actus tragicus belongs to the great musical literature of the world".

Recordings 
The cantata can be performed with only four singers, as in the recording by Joshua Rifkin, while other recordings feature a choir with multiple voices to a part. The following entries are taken from the listing on the Bach Cantatas Website. Choirs with one voice per part (OVPP) and  instrumental groups playing period instruments in historically informed performances are marked by green background.

Notes

References

External links 
 Gottes Zeit ist die allerbeste Zeit, BWV 106: performance by the Netherlands Bach Society (video and background information)
 
 God's time is the very best time (Actus tragicus) BWV 106; BC B 18 / Sacred cantata (Funeral)) Bach Digital on Bach digital
 Cantata BWV 106 – Gottes Zeit ist die allerbeste Zeit (Johann Sebastian Bach) ChoralWiki
 Bach Cantata Gottes Zeit (Actus Tragicus) – BWV 106 score Downloadable score (pdf) with modern clefs by atticbooks, 2016
 Brian Robins: Johann Sebastian Bach / Cantata No. 106, "Gottes Zeit ist die allerbeste Zeit," ("Actus Tragicus"), BWV 106 (BC B18) AllMusic
 Joe Hickman: A Performers Guide To J.S. Bach's Cantata BWV 106 in The Choral Journal, Vol. 27, No. 2 (September 1986), pp. 15–18, American Choral Directors Association

Church cantatas by Johann Sebastian Bach
Christian funeral music
1707 compositions
1708 compositions